The Official Classical Singles Chart was a record chart based on downloads and streaming of classical music in the United Kingdom. Each week's chart was compiled by the Official Charts Company (OCC) and was first published on Monday afternoon on their official website. The chart ran for 140 weeks from 2012 to 2015, during which time a total of 23 singles by 22 artists reached number one. The most successful artist was the Italian pianist Ludovico Einaudi, who topped the chart with three singles for a total of 54 weeks, while the most successful record label was Decca Records, which spent 89 weeks at number one with six singles. Einaudi's track "I Giorni" from his album of the same name spent 51 weeks at number one, longer than any other single. In January 2013, following the release of Einaudi's album In a Time Lapse, singles by the pianist accounted for 13 of the Top 20 on the Official Classical Singles Chart. Martin Talbot, managing director of the OCC, described him as one of the chart's "biggest and most consistent stars".

Singles would often top the chart as a result of exposure in popular media, including films such as Fifty Shades of Grey, The Dark Knight Rises and Man of Steel. In July 2012, a rendition of Spem in alium by the Tallis Scholars topped the chart following its usage in Fifty Shades of Grey. E. L. James, author of the original novel on which the film was based, said that she was delighted that her readers had been introduced to the piece of music, and that it was a "deserved number one". Three weeks later, the London Symphony Orchestra reached number one after their version of "Chariots of Fire" by Vangelis was used in the 2012 Summer Olympics opening ceremony. Three of the top five singles on that week's chart were related to the 2012 Summer Olympics.

Reaction to the Official Classical Singles Chart was generally positive. Tenor Russell Watson described it as "absolutely amazing", while the New Zealand soprano Hayley Westenra said that she was "really excited" about the chart's launch. Composer Paul Mealor described the chart as "absolutely fantastic". Conversely, Mike Spring, sales manager at Hyperion Records, was more skeptical, as he had observed that downloads of classical music had mainly comprised whole albums or works, rather than individual singles. Similarly, Anthony Anderson, managing director of classical music record label Naxos UK, stated: "By its nature, this chart will be more relevant to other companies."

Chart history

The Official Classical Singles Chart was launched in 2012. According to Umusic, the official website for Universal Music in the UK, it reflected a shift in the British public's consumption of classical music from albums to tracks. At the time of the launch, classical music was becoming more popular in the UK; the previous year, download sales of individual classical tracks had increased by 46% (from 834,000 to 1.2 million), while the single "Wherever You Are" by Military Wives had been the 2011 UK Singles Chart Christmas number one. During 2012's first quarter, approximately 284,000 classical music downloads were purchased in the UK, an increase of 34% compared to the same period the previous year. Alongside the new singles chart, the Classic Brit Awards announced at the same time that it would launch a Top Single Award at the 2012 ceremony to commemorate the most popular classical single that year.

The first chart was published on 28 May 2012, and was based solely on downloads of classical singles in the UK. At number one was a version of the UK's national anthem, "God Save the Queen", by the BBC Concert Orchestra and the British conductor Barry Wordsworth, which reached the top during the week of the Diamond Jubilee of Elizabeth II. From 27 June 2014, streaming counted towards the UK's music charts, including the Official Classical Singles Chart, with 100 streams equating to one download. The first number one under this new methodology was "Nessun dorma" by Luciano Pavarotti. After nearly three years of publication, the chart was retired in February 2015, with its final number one being "I Giorni" – lack of media interest was cited as the reason for its dissolution. Reflecting on the chart later that year, Phillip Sommerich of Rhinegold Publishing felt that its retirement spoke to the difficulty in generating excitement in the UK's classical music sector.

Number ones

By artist

Six artists spent five or more weeks at the top of the Official Classical Singles Chart.

By record label
Five record labels spent five or more weeks at the top of the Official Classical Singles Chart.

Data sources
The Official Classical Singles Chart was compiled by the OCC using download and (from June 2014) streaming data from the following music sources:

Websites

7Digital
Amazon.com
HMV.com
iTunes
Sainsburys.com
Tesco.com

Streaming services

Deezer
Music Unlimited
Napster
O2 Tracks
Spotify
We7

Notes

References

External links
Official Classical Singles Chart Top 20 at the Official Charts Company

2010s in British music
Classical Singles
British record charts
Classical music in the United Kingdom
Classical Singles